Western Gaels is a Gaelic Athletic Association club in west County Sligo, Republic of Ireland. It concentrates on hurling. The club has players from 4 football clubs in West Sligo, St Pats, St Farans, Enniscrone/Kilglass and Castleconnor. The club is affiliated as an exclusive hurling club to the Sligo County Board. The club won its first Sligo Senior Hurling Championship in 2010.

Honours

 Sligo Senior Hurling Championship:(1)
2010
Dermot molloy champions 
2009, 2010, 2011

History

Club History
Western Gaels Hurling Club was founded on 7 February 1999 at the inaugural meeting in Brownes Harbour Bar. The membership was open to U-14 boys from the parishes of Enniscrone/ Kilglass, Castleconnor, Easkey, Dromore & Templeboy. In the club's first year the team won the county final. The club won its first Senior County Hurling Championship in 2010 with the players from the original U-14’s being the backbone of the team. In the following years the club was decimated by emigration due to the recession but kept going with limited numbers. However in the last number of years the club has rebuilt and now has teams at every level from U-6 to senior.

Role in the community

Over the past 20 years Western Gaels has promoted hurling as regional club across parish and club boundaries, serving an area where participation was historically limited to National School competitions. As a club with no official ground of its own, they relied on utilising the facilities of local football clubs from Castleconnor to Templeboy. The club was founded on the ethos that football club rivalries staying at the entrance gate, which has enabled the development of relationships and the supporting of social sustainability across parish/club boundaries, for the promotion of hurling under one banner.

References

Gaelic games clubs in County Sligo